The spurred roundleaf bat (Hipposideros calcaratus) is a species of bat in the family Hipposideridae. It is found in Papua New Guinea and the Solomon Islands.

References

Hipposideros
Bats of Oceania
Mammals of Papua New Guinea
Mammals of the Solomon Islands
Mammals described in 1877
Taxa named by George Edward Dobson
Taxonomy articles created by Polbot
Bats of New Guinea